Darbaan is a 2020 Indian Hindi drama film directed and produced by Bipin Nadkarni under the banner of Opticus Picture Company with Yogesh Beldar as co-producer. This marks the debut of the director in Bollywood cinema. The film stars Sharib Hashmi, Sharad Kelkar, Rasika Dugal and Flora Saini.

The film was to be theatrically released on 3 April 2020, but postponed later due to COVID. It premiered on ZEE5 on 4 December 2020.

Premise 
Darbaan is an adaption of a 1918 short story Khokababur Pratyabartan written by Nobel Prize winner Rabindra Nath Tagore. The screenplay is about the friendship between a boy and his caretaker who come from different steps on the social and economic ladder.

Cast
 Sharib Hashmi as Raicharan (Raichu) aka Channa 
 Sharad Kelkar as Anukul Tripathi (Anu)
 Rasika Dugal as Bhuri, Raicharan’s wife
 Flora Saini as Charul Tripathi, Anukul's wife
 Harsh Chhaya as Naren Tripathi, Anukul’s father
 Suneeta Sengupta as Sushma Tripathi, Anukul’s mother
 Mukesh Ramani as Shiv Dayal, Anukul's driver
 Varun Sharma as Siddhanth Tripathi aka Siddhu, Raicharan's adopted son; Anukul's biological son (Cameo)
 Annu Kapoor as Narrator
 Dilavar makrani  as Police Officer

Soundtrack

The soundtrack of the film is composed by Amartya Bobo Rahut and Raajeev V. Bhalla whereas lyrics are written by Manoj Yadav, Siddhant Kaushal and Akshay K. Saxena.

Reception

Anna M. M. Vetticad of Firstpost found the film 'bitter-sweet'. She praised the acting of Hashmi, Dugal and supporting cast and music of Amartya Bobo Rahut. She criticised the screenplay of Nadkarni co-written with Rakesh Jadhav for robbing the narrative of the film with 'substance and considerable sociological commentary'. Praising cinematographer Amalendu Chaudhary for 'striking shots across several locations', she rated it with two and half stars out of five. Vetticad concluded, "Darbaan is nice enough, but it lacks depth and width." Pradeep Kumar reviewing for The Hindu called it "simplistic take on servitude that feels out of place". Agreeing with Vetticad, Kumar also criticised the screenplay because he felt, "...story remains under explored". He also found the soundtrack "endearing". He concluded, "However, beyond his [Hashmi's] classy performance, Darbaan seems like a script better suited to the stage than the canvas of a cinema.".

References

External links
 

2020 films
Indian drama films
Films based on short fiction
Films based on works by Rabindranath Tagore
Films postponed due to the COVID-19 pandemic
Hindi-language drama films
ZEE5 original films
Films not released in theaters due to the COVID-19 pandemic